Larissa Costa Silva de Oliveira (born March 9, 1984), commonly known as Larissa Costa, is a Brazilian beauty queen who won the Miss Brasil 2009. Larissa Costa represented Brazil in the Miss Universe 2009.

Biography
Born in Natal, Rio Grande do Norte, she is graduated in pedagogy, and works in the Secretaria de Educação de Natal (Secretariat of Education of Natal).

Pageants
Larissa Costa won the Miss Rio Grande do Norte in 2009, representing the city of São Gonçalo do Amarante. She won the national pageant in 2009 representing Rio Grande do Norte state. She beat the 1st runner-up, Rayanne Morais, of Minas Gerais state and the 2nd runner-up, Denise Ribeiro, of the Distrito Federal. Larissa Costa's coronation as Miss Brasil ended her region's 20-year period without winning the beauty contest, as in 1989, Flávia Cavalcante, from Ceará state, won the contest.

She represented Brazil at the Miss Universe 2009 in Nassau, Bahamas but failed to place.

References

1984 births
Living people
Miss Brazil winners
Miss Universe 2009 contestants
Brazilian female models
People from Natal, Rio Grande do Norte